Bodega Marine Reserve is a  nature reserve and marine reserve on the coast of northern California, located in the vicinity of the Bodega Marine Laboratory on Bodega Head.  It is a unit of the University of California Natural Reserve System, administered by the University of California, Davis.

Features
The reserve is adjacent to Bodega Bay and the open Pacific Ocean, on a peninsula in rural western Sonoma County.

Natural hazards of the area include high cliffs, sleeper waves, white sharks, poison oak, Lyme disease, hantavirus, skunks, and mountain lions.

See also
California coastal prairie
Northern coastal scrub  
California coastal sage and chaparral ecoregion

References

External links
 

Marine reserves of the United States
Protected areas of Sonoma County, California
University of California, Davis
University of California Natural Reserve System
Bodega Bay